In computational complexity theory, the complexity class NE is the set of decision problems that can be solved by a non-deterministic Turing machine in time O(kn) for some k.

NE, unlike the similar class NEXPTIME, is not closed under polynomial-time many-one reductions.

Relationship to other classes

NE is contained by NEXPTIME.

See also
 E (complexity)

References

Complexity classes